Jockeybush Lake is located east of Powley Place, New York. Fish species present in the lake are brook trout, and sunfish. There is trail access to the lake from CR-10.

References

Lakes of New York (state)
Lakes of Hamilton County, New York